The World of the Lupi is an urban fantasy series by author Eileen Wilks. It is also known as the Moon Children series.

Main characters
 Lily Yu 
POSITION: FBI Agent in the Magical Crimes Division
GIFT: sensitive, who can feel different types of magic but cannot be affected by it
MATE: Rule Turner, is his Chosen (bonded by the Lady)
RACIAL BACKGROUND: Asian American (Chinese origins)
PHYSICAL FEATURES: Straight shoulder length black hair, slim, physically fit, 5'1", 28 years old

 Rule Turner
POSITION: Lu Nuncio of the Nokolai (heir or prince). Clanhome is located in San Diego, California
ABILITY: Lupus
MATE: Lily Yu
RACIAL BACKGROUND: Anglo (French)
PHYSICAL FEATURES: handsome in an imperfect way, 60 years old (looks younger)

 Li Lei Yu (Grandmother, Tiger Lady)
POSITION: Head of the Yu Family
GIFT: unknown, but has magical knowledge and powers, can transform into a tiger
MATE: Li Qin? (Helper?)
RACIAL BACKGROUND: Chinese
PHYSICAL FEATURES: looks about 80 years older (but is much older >300 years), petite, despite age has a ramrod straight posture

 Cullen Seaborne
POSITION: Nokolai member, formerly expelled from Etorri clan for his pursuit of magic (was clanless for a long time)
GIFT: Fire. Sorcerer, can see sorceri, and has a strong understanding of spells. Wants to learn more
MATE: Cynna Weaver
RACIAL BACKGROUND: Anglo
PHYSICAL FEATURES: extremely gorgeous, moves beautifully, looks young (but is 68 yrs old)

 Cynna Weaver
POSITION: FBI Agent in the Magical Crimes Division
GIFT: Finder, can locate anything once she has their pattern. A former Dizzy apprentice to Jiri, a type of African magic that deals with tattoos and demons.  
MATE: Cullen Seaborne
RACIAL BACKGROUND: Caucasian American
PHYSICAL FEATURES: Amazonian, tall and big breasted. Has short spiky blond hair and is covered in tattoos which help her with her spells

Side characters

 Abel Karonski
Position: FBI Agent, part of Magical Crimes Division; Wiccan.

 Arjenie Fox
Position: FBI researcher

 Benedict Two Horses
Position: Son of Isen Turner, Brother to Rule Turner

 Edward Yu
Position: Lily's father

 Isen Turner
Position: Rho to the Nokolai, Rule's Father

 Jiri
Position: Cynna's former teacher

 Julia Yu
Position: Lily's mother

 Li Qin
Position: Companion to Grandmother

 Nettie Two Horses
Position: Nokolai's clan healer

 Ruben Brooks
Position: FBI Agent, head of the Magical Crimes Division; Lily and Cynna's boss; Precognitive.

 Toby
Position: Rule's son

 Victor Frey
Position: Rho to the Leidolf, made Rule Lu Nuncio of Leidolf

 Xavier Fagin
Position: Research Consultant.

Novels in this series
 Only Human (Lover Beware anthology) - July 2003
 Originally Human (Cravings anthology) - July 2004
 Tempting Danger - October 5, 2004
 Mortal Danger - November 1, 2005
 Blood Lines - January 2007
 InHuman (On the Prowl anthology) - August 2007
 Night Season - January 2, 2008
 Mortal Sins - February 3, 2009
 Blood Magic - February, 2010
 Blood Challenge (January 2011)
 Death Magic (November 2011)
 Mortal ties (October 2012)
 Ritual Magic (September 2013)
 Unbinding (October 2014)
 Mind Magic (November 2015)
 Dragon Spawn (2016)
 Dragon Blood (2018)

References

External links
Eileen Wilks Official website

Fantasy books by series
Werewolf written fiction
World of the Lupi books